Mike Becker was born in 1943 and is an American bridge player and official. Becker is from Boca Raton, Florida. He is a son of B. Jay Becker.

As of 1979, Becker and Ron Rubin were partners in a New York City options firm and at the bridge table. Becker trained  more than 50 bridge players, 15 of whom were national champions. At bridge they used a strong one-club, relay bidding system that they called "the Ultimate Club". They played on the last of the "Aces" teams sponsored by Dallas businessman Ira Corn, which won the 1983 Bermuda Bowl world team championship.

In the American Contract Bridge League (ACBL) Becker was President of the Greater New York Bridge Association in 1980, chaired committees governing the U.S. International Team Trials from 1996 to 2012, and the Hall of Fame in 2003. He was the founding president of the United States Bridge Federation, established in 2001 primarily to select and support teams that represent the United States in world competition. He was inducted into the ACBL Hall of Fame in 2006.

Publications

 The Ultimate Club, Mike Becker and others (New York: Monna Lisa Precision Corp., 1977)
 The Ultimate Club, Michael Becker, Matt Ginsberg, Matthew Granovetter, and Ron Rubin (Livingston, NJ: Ultimate Club, 1981)

Bridge accomplishments

Honors

 ACBL Hall of Fame, 2006

Wins

 North American Bridge Championships (20)
 von Zedtwitz Life Master Pairs (1) 1990 
 Silodor Open Pairs (1) 1988 
 Grand National Teams (7) 2007, 2008, 2011, 2012, 2013, 2015, 2018 
 Vanderbilt (6) 1977, 1981, 1985, 1989, 2005, 2019 
 Mitchell Board-a-Match Teams (3) 2007, 2012, 2019 
 Spingold (4) 1972, 1980, 1982, 1992 
 Reisinger (1) 2016

Runners-up

 North American Bridge Championships
 von Zedtwitz Life Master Pairs (1) 1975 
 Silodor Open Pairs (1) 1998 
 Grand National Teams (2) 1981, 1992 
 Vanderbilt (3) 1978, 1999, 2004 
 Mitchell Board-a-Match Teams (2) 1968, 2008 
 Reisinger (5) 1967, 1983, 2002, 2004, 2007 
 Spingold (2) 1968, 1988

References

External links
 Bridge Winners profile (maintained by Becker)
 
 

1943 births
American contract bridge players
Bermuda Bowl players
People from Tenafly, New Jersey
Living people
Place of birth missing (living people)
Date of birth missing (living people)